Scolicotrichum is a genus of fungi in the family Mycosphaerellaceae.

References 

Mycosphaerellaceae genera
Dothideomycetes genera